127 (Persian: ١٢٧) is an Iranian five piece band – guitar, piano, trombone, bass and drums – with roots in Iranian melodies and jazz with an alternative sound.

Members include Sohrab Mohebbi (guitar/vocals), Sardar Sarmast (piano), Salmak Khaledi (trombone), Alireza Pourassad (bass), Yayha Alkhansa (drums) and Shervin Shahamipour (back vocals, setar).

Discography
 Coming around (2005)
 The Full time job (2006)
 Khal Punk (2008)
 Pop Emergency (2011)
 Be Raahe Khod (2019)

References

External links
 127 Official web site
 127 on Facebook
 127 on Myspace Music
 127 on Youtube
 127 on SoundCloud

Gypsy punk groups
Iranian rock music groups
Culture in Tehran